The 2016 CIS Women's Ice Hockey Championship was held from March 17–20, 2016, in Calgary, Alberta. The bronze medal game between Saint Mary's and Guelph was held at the Joan Snyder Arena, while the remainder of the tournament was contested at Markin MacPhail Arena on the campus of the University of Calgary. 
Montreal’s Alexandra Labelle recorded a hat trick in the gold medal game, part of an 8-0 shutout triumph versus the UBC Thunderbirds.

Participating teams

Championship Bracket

Consolation Bracket

Awards and honours
Tournament most valuable player: Marie-Pier Chabot, Montreal

Players of the Game

All-Tournament Team

References

External links 
 Championship Website

U Sports women's ice hockey
Ice hockey in Alberta
2015–16 in Canadian ice hockey
University of Calgary